Leslie John "Les" Perry (29 January 1923 – 17 September 2005) was an Australian long-distance runner.

Perry finished sixth in the 5000 m event at the 1952 Summer Olympics. He also ran the marathon at the 1956 Summer Olympics and 10,000 m in 1952, but did not complete both races. He was the national champion in the 3 miles in 1949–1953, and placed seventh in this event at the 1950 British Empire Games.
After the completion of his international career, Perry was instrumental in the establishment and success of the Ringwood Athletics Club.

References

External links 

 
 
 
 

1923 births
2005 deaths
Australian male long-distance runners
Olympic athletes of Australia
Athletes (track and field) at the 1952 Summer Olympics
Athletes (track and field) at the 1956 Summer Olympics
Commonwealth Games competitors for Australia
Athletes (track and field) at the 1950 British Empire Games